Villa Oliva is a village in the Ñeembucú department of Paraguay.

Sources 
World Gazeteer: Paraguay
villa Oliva in istria

Populated places in the Ñeembucú Department